Paulino Salvador Cueto Leachon, better known as Doy Leachon, is a Filipino politician and lawyer. A member of PDP–Laban, served as the representative for Oriental Mindoro's 1st congressional district from 2013 to 2022. Upon reaching his term-limit as representative, he ran in the 2022 Oriental Mindoro gubernatorial race, losing to incumbent governor Humerlito Dolor.

Early life and education 
Leachon was born in Calapan, Oriental Mindoro on May 13, 1974. He attended San Beda College of Law, where he graduated with Bachelor of Laws. Following the graduation, he worked as a taxi driver, as well as a fast food crew member. He was also a private lawyer.

Political career

Local politics 
Leachon began his political career through his election as the Mayor of Calapan in 2007, when he was 33 years old.

In 2009, Leachon was charged for graft for the private usage of city-owned dump trucks. He was acquitted from this case in April 2019.

Congressional career 
He was first elected to the House of Representatives in the 2013 election, where he ran in Oriental Mindoro's 1st congressional district, defeating Nico Valencia, who was the son of the then incumbent representative Rodolfo Valencia. He was re-elected in 2016, defeating Joel Teves of the United Nationalist Alliance.

On March 2, 2020, Leachon was voted out of the House of Representatives Electoral Tribunal (HRET), where he was chairman. Luis Raymund Villafuerte, the representative for Camarines Sur's 2nd congressional District, cited conflict of interest as a reason for his ouster, as Leachon did not disclose his pending case before the tribunal. Although Leachon denounced Villafuerte's claim, he was replaced by Ron Salo.

On October 14, 2020, Leachon was named Deputy Speaker of the House of Representatives, along with Michael Romero.

2022 Oriental Mindoro gubernatorial campaign 
In 2022, upon reaching the three-term limit, Leachon opted to run for Governor of Oriental Mindoro. He would lose the race to incumbent governor Humerlito Dolor, with a margin of 73,495 votes.

Political positions 
Leachon is a supporter of the death penalty.

Political party

Mindoro Bago Sarili 

Mindoro Bago Sarili (MBS Party) is a provincial political party based in the province of Oriental Mindoro. It is headed by Doy Leachon, former member of the Philippine House of Representatives from Oriental Mindoro's 1st District.

History 
The party formed in Oriental Mindoro by Congresman. Doy Leachon in 2020s before the 2022 election will began, In September 20, 2021 the party was all ready registered by COMELEC.

Leader 
 Doy Leachon (Since September 20, 2021)

Electoral performance

Personal life 
Leachon is married to Rona Leachon, who unsuccessfully ran for the Calapan mayoralty in 2016. His elder brother, Tony Leachon, is a doctor.

References

External links 
 Paulino Salvador Leachon on Facebook

1974 births
Living people
PDP–Laban politicians
Members of the House of Representatives of the Philippines from Oriental Mindoro
Mayors of places in Oriental Mindoro